City Engineering College was started in 2001 by the Jayanagar Education Society. The college is located next to Gokulam apartments, Pipe Line Road, Vasanthapura, off Kanakapura Road, approximately 13 km from Majestic, Bangalore.

The college is the sister project of AMC Engineering College, Bangalore.  It started a civil engineering branch in the 2011–12 academic year.

Students have got ranks both in B.E. and M.B.A. The college has a placement cell and is headed by Prof. Deepak. N. R. Placement training is managed by Triumphant Institute of Management Education and Indian Institute of Training and Management.

Staff

The principal is Dr. Ramamurthy. V. S With HOD(Head of department) of Civil Department Dr. Thippe Swamy. The HOD of CSE Department Dr. Sandhya. N. The Mechanical Department is headed by Dr. Karunakara. The Electronics Department is headed by Dr. Rajshekhar, HOD of Chemistry Dept., he also looks after student activities. The Physics Department is headed by Dr. K. Sujatha, and the Math Department is headed by Dr. Jyothi. P.

Student activities
The events are planned, organized and managed by the students themselves under supervision of Student Counsellers- from fund collecting drives to the final events. These include blood donation camps, cloth donation drives, and events conducted by the National Service Scheme.

Students publish the annual magazine Eternal Enigma.

The college conducts annual sports events, technical symposiums, cultural activities, photography and art contests including a platform for a fashion show.

The intra-college events are organized by the students' activity clubs. The clubs hold debates, organises plays, all kind of fun activities including technical and general quizzes.

There are active student groups divided over respective branches:
 Core Club: initiated by students of CSE.
 Mechano: dedicated to mechanics.
 Infomax: created and maintained by students of ISE.
 Citronics: created by the students and for the students of ECE branch.
 Trekkies: created by the students of City Engineering College formerly headed by Deekshith.S.M with an objective to participate in Adventured Activities.

External links 

 Official website
 City College
 ACE COLLEGE OF ENGINEERING
 
  Jayanagar Education Society]

Engineering colleges in Bangalore
Affiliates of Visvesvaraya Technological University
2001 establishments in Karnataka